Irini Konitopoulou-Legaki (15 December 1931 – 28 March 2022) was a Greek singer of Nisiotika.

Biography
Konitopoulou-Legaki was born in Keramoti, Naxos, on 15 December 1931. She was the daughter of prominent violinist Michalis Konitopoulos and Maria Fyrogenis. Of the 11 children of the family, five survived: Irini, Giorgos, Kostas, Angeliki and Vangelis. In 1951, she settled in Athens and became especially known for the collaboration of the National Radio Foundation (EIR) with Simon Karas.

In 1955, Konitopoulou-Legaki married Stelios Legakis and they had four children. Together with her brother George Konitopoulos and her daughter Eleni Legaki, they charted an important course in the field of Nisiotika.

Konitopoulou-Legaki died on 28 March 2022, at the age of 90.

References

1931 births
2022 deaths
Greek folk singers
20th-century Greek women singers
21st-century Greek women singers
People from Naxos